Aaahh!!! Real Monsters is an action-adventure platform game developed by Realtime Associates and published by Viacom New Media in 1995 for the Sega Genesis and SNES based on the animated series Aaahh!!! Real Monsters on Nickelodeon.

Plot 
In order to graduate from Monster Academy, three young monsters, Ickis, Oblina, and Krumm, need to pass their Monster Midterm Exam. This test has them scaring a number of people that their headmaster, the Gromble, orders them to scare in order to pass the exam.

Gameplay 

Playing as Ickis, Oblina, or Krumm, the player explores various locales collecting specific items and scaring specific people the Gromble instructs the player to. The characters start out in the sewer and progress through levels above the human world. Players can switch between each character at will and each has their own special ability that often can be used to solve puzzles or overcome obstacles: Ickis can fly for a short time, Oblina can reach high ledges, and Krumm can scan off-screen areas. 

The monsters can also perform team moves, such as stacking on top of one another to reach items normally out of reach. The characters' main weapon is trash, which they can hurl at enemies. Collecting garbage sacks and fish bones gives a limited amount of stronger ammo, triple trash, throwing three pieces of trash at once. Collecting "Monster Manuals" allows them to perform a "scare" which defeats any enemies on screen, spooking them into running for their lives, or taking a certain number of hit points off a boss's health. The goal of the game is to finish all levels and find all the items to pass the exam, including defeating a boss target at the end of the final level above ground, with the final boss being, in most cases, the monsters' sworn enemy, Simon the Monster Hunter.

Reception 

Reviewing the Super NES version, Tommy Glide of GamePro called the game "run-of-the-mill platform-hopping". He criticized the level design, choppy scrolling, weak backgrounds, and stiff controls, and found the high-quality music and sounds to be the one positive note.

See also 

 Aaahh!!! Real Monsters
 List of Sega Genesis games
 List of Super NES games

References

External links 
 

Sega Genesis games
Super Nintendo Entertainment System games
1995 video games
Realtime Associates games
Video games developed in the United States
Aaahh!!! Real Monsters video games
Single-player video games
Action-adventure games
Platform games
Klasky Csupo video games